Troxacitabine (brand name Troxatyl) is a nucleoside analogue with anticancer activity. Its use is being studied in patients with refractory lymphoproliferative diseases.

References 

Experimental cancer drugs